Statistics of Division 2 in the 1989/1990 season.

Overview
It was contested by 36 teams, and Nancy and Stade Rennais won the championship.

League tables

Group A

Group B

Championship play-offs

|}

Promotion play-offs

Top goalscorers

References
France - List of final tables (RSSSF)

Ligue 2 seasons
French
2